New Centre (JC) was a centre-left political party in Latvia.
In 2005, the JC entered the Harmony Centre coalition, which won 17 seats in the 2006 election. It merged into the Harmony party in 2010.

Election results

Legislative elections

External links 
 jaunaiscentrs.lv (in Russian and Latvian)

References

Defunct political parties in Latvia
Russian political parties in Latvia